Szervác is a Latin-based Hungarian male name meaning: Freed.
However this is a given name in Hungary this is also a unique name of a family in the libre art.

See:
 Saint Servatius
 Szervác
 Attila Szervác composer, librartist, 1973-
 József Szervác, poet, librartist, 1952



Nameday
 May 13

Other given names

 Name days in Hungary
 Most popular given names

Hungarian masculine given names